Maxime Chazal (born 24 April 1993, in Nouméa) is a French tennis player. Chazal has a career high ATP singles ranking of 234, achieved on 7 March 2016. Chazal made his ATP main draw doubles debut at the 2013 Open 13 where he partnered Martin Vaïsse but lost in the first round. He won 9 ITF Futures (2013 : 2 ; 2015 : 5 ; 2016 : 2) and 6 ITF Futures in doubles (2015 : 1 ; 2017 : 3 ; 2018 : 2).

Finals: 28 (15–13)

Singles: 26 (11–15)

Wins (11)

Runner-up (15)

Doubles: 10 (6–4)

Wins (6)

Runner-Up (4)

External links
 
 

1993 births
Living people
French male tennis players
New Caledonian male tennis players